Neaspilota achilleae is a species of tephritid or fruit flies in the genus Neaspilota of the family Tephritidae.

Distribution
Canada, United States.

References

Tephritinae
Insects described in 1900
Diptera of North America
Taxa named by Charles Willison Johnson